The Canon EF-S 55–250mm 4–5.6 IS lenses are a series of telephoto zoom lenses for Canon EOS digital single-lens reflex cameras with a Canon EF-S lens mount.

All versions of the lens provide a 35 mm equivalent focal length of 88–400mm, and are advertised by Canon as providing four-stop image stabilization. Additionally, it has a high maximum magnification ratio for a non-macro lens.

The first lens was released in America in mid-April 2008 for a retail price of US$255, and advertised as a companion to the Canon EF-S 18–55mm IS.

The Mark II version of the lens was announced June 2011, identical in specification to the previous version and featuring exactly the same optics and IS system but with a revised external design.

In August 2013 a new version of the lens was announced, featuring a revised optical formula and Canon's STM (stepping motor) technology. This lens shipped to retailers in late September 2013 and was initially priced at US$350.

Specifications

References

External links

Reviews
 From The Digital Picture
 From SLR Gear

55-250mm lens